Aquidauana is a municipality located in the Brazilian state of Mato Grosso do Sul.  It takes its name from the river with which the name is shared.

The first European settlers were imperial soldiers who arrived during the Paraguayan War and were then settled on the lands they had occupied, between the Rivers Aquidauana and Negro, after the cessation of hostilities.

Aquidauana was founded on 15 August 1892 by a local committee including several leading colonels and farmers. The first teacher at the city's first school, opened in 1894, was a man called Teodoro Rondon.  Aquidauana gained municipal status in 1918.

Aquidauanense Futebol Clube is the municipality association football club.

References

External links 

Pantanal Escapes - Travel Guide and tourist information for Aquidauana

Municipalities in Mato Grosso do Sul
Populated places established in 1892